Uilke Vuurman (2 October 1872 – 14 July 1955) was a Dutch sport shooter who competed at the 1900 Summer Olympics and the 1908 Summer Olympics.

He was born in Rotterdam and died in Velp. He was the father of Tieleman Vuurman who competed also as sport shooter at the Olympics.

In the 1900 Summer Olympics he participated in the following events:

 Team military rifle, three positions - fifth place
 military rifle, kneeling - sixth place
 military rifle, prone - eighth place
 individual military rifle, three positions - 14th place
 military rifle, standing - 22nd place

Eight years later he finished seventh with the Dutch team in the team free rifle competition.

References

External links
 
list of Dutch sport shooters

1872 births
1955 deaths
Dutch male sport shooters
ISSF rifle shooters
Olympic shooters of the Netherlands
Shooters at the 1900 Summer Olympics
Shooters at the 1908 Summer Olympics
Sportspeople from Rotterdam
20th-century Dutch people